Matt Martin (born January 30, 1971) is a British politician and Mendip District Councillor representing Moor ward. He is a member of the UK Liberal Democrat Party.

Mendip District Council (2019–present)

On May 10, 2019, Matt Martin joined twenty one fellow Liberal Democrat candidates to regain control of Mendip District Council after eight years of Conservative control.

External Appointments 
Since 2019 Matt Martin has represented Mendip District Council holding board positions with the Somerset Waste Partnership, the Somerset Rivers Authority, the Axe & Brue Drainage Board, and as Deputy Chair for the Somerset Building Control Partnership.

Electoral history

References

External links
 
 Matt Martin at Mendip District Council

1971 births
Living people
Liberal Democrats (UK) councillors
Politicians from Sussex
21st-century British politicians